The second series of Hollyoaks Later is a British television series which ran for one week starting 28 September 2009. Hollyoaks Later is a spin-off of the Channel 4 soap opera Hollyoaks.

Development
It was revealed on 17 April 2009 that former Hollyoaks producer Bryan Kirkwood would produce the show.

On 3 August 2009, it was announced that Nicola Stapleton would play Savannah, the estranged friend of Cindy Cunningham. The series will feature "an unlikely wedding", "the Ashworths attending a music festival", "a trip to London for the McQueen clan" and "a dramatic boot camp plot with Sarah, Zoë and Lydia which ends in tragedy". On 15 August 2009, it was reported that Sarah, Zoë and Lydia would be involved in a storyline which sees the three characters skydiving, however one of the parachutes will be "sabotaged" by a jealous Lydia, which will lead to the death of either Sarah or Zoë.

For the scenes inside the plane before the skydiving, the production team used a storage area in Tatenhill Airfield, Staffordshire.

On 26 August 2009, it was announced singer Bonnie Tyler would guest in the series as herself.

In September, the Hollyoaks website released a trailer for the series. It was also revealed that Alison Burrows had been cast as Kathleen McQueen, the mother of Theresa.

Plot

The series follows four stories. Rhys, Hannah and Josh Ashworth head off to a music festival. Whilst there, Rhys and Hannah are tempted by love interests Imogen and Jamie, however the pair are not as nice as they seem. Jacqui McQueen and Darren Osborne try their best to convince Tony Hutchinson and Cindy Cunningham not to get married, and Cindy is less than pleased at the appearance of former best friend Savannah. Theresa and Michaela McQueen set off to London where Theresa has an interview with a modelling agency. As they face living on the streets of London, Theresa decides to visit her mother. Jealous Lydia Hart follows girlfriend Sarah Barnes on a camping trip where she finds her getting closer to Zoe Carpenter. Her jealousy leads to a chain of events and the death of one of the group.

Cast
The following is a list of cast members who appeared in the series: Actor Daniel Goldenberg went on to reprise his role as Kingsley in Hollyoaks briefly in November 2009. In 2010, Finn Jones and Kyle Rees also returned to play their characters of Jamie and Blue.

Ratings

References

External links
 Hollyoaks Later at E4.com
 Hollyoaks at Channel4.com

2009 British television seasons
L